The Amorous Old Woman; Or, 'Tis Well If It Take is a 1674 comedy play by the English writer Thomas Duffet. It was originally staged by the King's Company at the Lincoln's Inn Fields Theatre. It was part of the tradition of Restoration comedy.

Given the number of younger actors in the cast, it may have been a lenten play. The original cast included William Beeston as Amante, Carey Perin as Cicco, John Coysh as  Riccamare, Martin Powell as  Furfante, Elizabeth Cox as  Constantia, Elizabeth James as Arabella, Elizabeth Boutell as Clara and Katherine Corey as Strega.

References

Bibliography
 Canfield, J. Douglas. Tricksters and Estates: On the Ideology of Restoration Comedy. University Press of Kentucky, 2014.
 Van Lennep, W. The London Stage, 1660-1800: Volume One, 1660-1700. Southern Illinois University Press, 1960.

1674 plays
West End plays
Plays by Thomas Duffet
Restoration comedy